Hame is a village in the municipality of Debar, North Macedonia.

Demographics
As of the 2021 census, Hame had 19 residents with the following ethnic composition:
Persons for whom data are taken from administrative sources 15
Albanians 4

According to the 2002 census, the village had a total of 135 inhabitants. Ethnic groups in the village include:
Albanians 135

References

External links

Villages in Debar Municipality
Albanian communities in North Macedonia